Dhikr (also spelled Zikr, Thikr, Zekr, or Zikar, literally meaning "remembrance, reminder"  or "mention") is a form of Islamic meditation in which phrases or prayers are repeatedly chanted in order to remember God.  It plays a central role in Sufi Islam, and each Sufi order has usually adopted a specific dhikr, typically accompanied by specific posture, breathing, and movement. In Sufi Islam, dhikr refers to both the act of this remembrance as well as the prayers used in these acts of remembrance. Dhikr can be performed in solitude or as a collective group. It can be counted on a set of prayer beads (Misbaha ) or through the fingers of the hand.  A person who recites the Dhikr is called a Dhakir, literally "he who remembers." The content of the prayers includes the names of God, or a dua (prayer of supplication) taken from the hadiths or the Quran.

Importance 
There are several verses in the Quran that emphasize the importance of remembering the will of God by saying phrases such as "God willing" "God knows best," and "If it is your will.' This is the basis for dhikr. Surah al-Kahf (18), Ayah 24 states a person who forgets to say, "God willing", should immediately remember God by saying, "Maybe my Lord will guide me to [something] more akin to rectitude than this." Other verses include Surah al-Ahzab (33), Ayah 41, "O you who have faith! Remember Allah with frequent remembrance", and Surah ar-Ra'd (13), Ayah 28, "those who have faith, and whose hearts find rest in the remembrance of Allah.' Look! The hearts find rest in Allah's remembrance!"

Muslims believe dhikr is one of the best ways to enter the higher level of Heaven and to glorify the Monotheistic Oneness of God.

To Sufis, dhikr is seen as a way to gain spiritual enlightenment and achieve union (visal) or annihilation (fana) in God. All Muslim sects endorse individual rosaries as a method of meditation, the goal of which is to obtain a feeling of peace, separation from worldly values (dunya), and, in general, strengthen Iman (faith).

Common types

Phrases and expressions
There are numerous conventional phrases and expressions invoking God.

Quran as Dhikr 

Reciting the Quran sincerely is also considered a kind of Dhikr. For example:
 Reciting Surah al-Ikhlas (112) is equal to one-third of the Quran.
 Reciting Surah al-Ikhlas (112) 10 times gives a palace in Heaven.
 Reciting Surah al-Kafirun (109) is equal to one-fourth of the Quran.
 Reciting Surah an-Nasr (110) is equal to one-fourth of the Quran.
 Reciting Surah az-Zalzalah (99) is equal to half of the Quran.

Hadiths mentioning virtues

It is mentioned in hadith that where people are oblivious to dhikir, remembrance of Allah is like being steadfast in jihad when others are running away (Targhib, p. 193, vol. 3 ref. Bazar and Tibrani).

The Islamic Prophet Muhammad is reported to have taught his daughter Fatimah bint Rasul Allah a special manner of Dhikr which is known as the "Tasbih of Fatimah". This consists of:
 33 repetitions of subḥāna -llah, meaning "Glorified is God". This saying is known as Tasbih.
 33 repetitions of al-ḥamdu lillāh, meaning "All Praise belongs to God". This saying is known as Tahmid.
 34 repetitions of ʾallāhu ʾakbar (ٱللَّٰهُ أَكْبَرُ), meaning "God is Greater [than everything]". This saying is known as Takbir.

The Shia way of doing the Tasbih of Fatimah is:
 34 repetitions of ʾallāhu ʾakbar (ٱللَّٰهُ أَكْبَرُ), meaning "God is Greater [than everything]". This saying is known as Takbir.
 33 repetitions of al-ḥamdu lillāh, meaning "All Praise belongs to God". This saying is known as Tahmid.
 33 repetitions of subḥāna -llah, meaning "Glorified is God". This saying is known as Tasbih.
 Saying one time at the end: La ilaha il Allah (There is no god but Allah).

Prayer beads 
Known also as Tasbih, these are usually Misbaha (prayer beads) upon a string, 33, 99, or 100 in number, which correspond to the names of God in Islam and other recitations. The beads are used to keep track of the number of recitations that make up the dhikr.

When the dhikr involves the repetition of particular phrases a specific number of times, the beads are used to keep track so that the person performing dhikr can turn all of their focus on what is actually being said - as it can become difficult to concentrate simultaneously on the number and phrasing when one is doing so a substantial number of times.

In the United States, Muslim inmates are allowed to utilize prayer beads for therapeutic effects. In Alameen v. Coughlin, 892 F. Supp. 440 (E.D.N.Y 1995), Imam Hamzah S. Alameen, a/k/a Gilbert Henry, and Robert Golden brought suit against Thomas A. Coughlin III, etc., et alia (Head of the Department of Corrections) in the State of New York pursuant to 42 USC Section 1983. The plaintiffs argued that prisoners have a First Amendment Constitutional right to pursue Islamic healing therapy called KASM (قاسَمَهُ | qaasama | taking an oath ) which uses prayer beads.  The rosary of oaths, which Alameen developed, was used to successfully rehabilitate inmates suffering from co-occurring mental health challenges and substance abuse issues during the 1990s.  All people, including Muslims and Catholics, were allowed to use prayer beads inside prisons, lest their freedom of religion be violated when the prison administration forbade their possession as contraband in the penal system. The practice of carrying prayer beads became controversial when gang-members began carrying specific colors of prayer beads to identify themselves.

Dhakir 

A "dhakir" or "Zaker" (literally "mentioner"' a speaker who refers to something briefly/incidentally), or reminder, is considered a maddah who reminds the remembering of Allah (and His Dhikr) for people, and he himself should also be reciter of dhikhr; namely, not only he ought to be a recital of Dhikr, but also he should put the audience in the situation of dhikr reminding (of Allah and likewise Ahl al-Bayt). Idiomatically the term means "praiser of God" or "professional narrator of the tragedies of Karbala (and Ahl al-Bayt)". To some extent, it can mean Maddah/panegyrist too.

The root of the word "Dhakir" is "Dhikr" which means remembering/praising; and the word "Dhakiri" is the act which is done by Dhakir, i.e. mentioning the Dhikr (of Allah, the Ahl al-Bayt, etc.) by observing its specific principles/manners.

Sufi view 
Followers of Sufism often engage in ritualized dhikr ceremonies, the details of which vary between Sufi orders or tariqah. Each order, or lineage within an order, has one or more forms for group dhikr, the liturgy of which may include recitation, singing, music, dance, costumes, incense, muraqaba (meditation), ecstasy, and trance. Common terms for the forms of litany employed include "hizb" (pl. "ahzab"), "wird" (pl. "awrad") and durood. An example of a popular work of litany is Dala'il al-Khayrat. Another type of group dhikr ceremony that is most commonly performed in Arab countries is called the haḍra (lit. presence). A haḍra can draw upon secular Arab genres and typically last for hours. Finally, sama` (lit. audition) is a type of group ceremony that consist mostly of recited spiritual poetry and Quranic recitation.

See also

Tasbih of Fatimah
As-salamu alaykum
Peace be upon him
Salawat
Durood
Dua
Salat
Sabr
Adhan
Tashahhud
Japa

References

Citations

Sources

Touma, Habib Hassan (1996). The Music of the Arabs, trans. Laurie Schwartz. Portland, Oregon: Amadeus Press. .

Further reading
Al-Ameen, Hamzah.Dhikr (Islamic Mindfulness): Using Neuro-lingual Programming In Cognitive Spiritual Therapy. Upublish.info
 Brodersen, Angelika. Remembrance, in Muhammad in History, Thought, and Culture: An Encyclopedia of the Prophet of God (2 vols.), Edited by C. Fitzpatrick and A. Walker, Santa Barbara, ABC-CLIO, 2014, Vol. II, pp. 520–523. 
Algar, Hamid, trans. The Path of God's Bondsmen: From Origin to Return. North Haledon, NJ: Islamic Publication International, 1980.
Schimmel, Annemarie. Mystical Dimensions of Islam. Chapel Hill: The University of North Carolina P, 1975.
Gardet, L. Dhikr.  Encyclopaedia of Islam, Second Edition.  Edited by: P. Bearman, Th. Bianquis, C.E. Bosworth, E. van Donzel and W.P. Heinrichs. Brill, 2009.
Jawadi Amuli, Abdullah. Dhikr and the Wisdom Behind It.
Privratsky, Bruce. Muslim Turkistan: Kazak Religion and Collective Memory., p. 104.

External links
 A brief illustrated guide to Qalbi Zikr

Sufism
Spiritual practice
Language and mysticism
Arabic words and phrases
Islamic belief and doctrine
Islamic terminology